Alexander Hill Key (September 21, 1904 – July 25, 1979) was an American science fiction writer who primarily wrote children's literature.

Early life
Key was born in 1904 in LaPlatte, Maryland.  His parents, Alexander Hill and Charlotte (Ryder) Key, soon moved the family to Florida where he spent the next 6 years of his life.  His father owned a sawmill and cotton gin, which were burned by nightriders shortly before his father's death.  Between the time of his father's death and his mother's death in an accident when he was 15, Key attended at least 14 different schools, including a military school in Georgia.  After his mother's death, he was raised by various relatives for the rest of his childhood.  At 18, he enrolled in the School of the Art Institute in Chicago, Illinois which he attended between 1921-1923.

Literary work

His novel Escape to Witch Mountain was made into a popular live-action film by Disney in 1975, 1995, and again in 2009. The sequel was made into another popular film in 1978. His novel The Incredible Tide became a popular anime series called Future Boy Conan in 1978.

He is known for his portrayals of alien but human-looking people who have tremendously strong psychic/psionic abilities, a close communion with nature, and who can telepathically speak with animals. In his nonfiction book The Strange White Doves, he professed his belief that animals are conscious, thinking, feeling, perceiving, independent, and self-aware intelligent beings, and that they have subtle ways of communicating, perhaps via empathy or telepathy. The protagonists of Key's books are often ostracized, feared, or persecuted because of their astonishing abilities or extraterrestrial origins, and Key uses this as a clear metaphor for racism and other prejudice.

In several of his novels (most notably The Case of the Vanishing Boy), Key portrays some sort of communal withdrawal from society by a group of like-minded individuals. Key sometimes depicted government-sponsored social services for children as inefficient or even counterproductive in its efforts: in The Forgotten Door, social services is presented as a clearly undesirable alternative for the protagonist Little Jon, and, in Escape to Witch Mountain, Tony and Tia actively flee the system. In both cases, however, it is for a very logical reason: the characters are "not from around here". All they want to do is go home and, happily, a few of us locals have the decency to help them do so (Key's The Forgotten Door predates E.T. the Extra-Terrestrial by over 10 years).

The plot of Key's The Magic Meadow is even more poignant for any reader who has ever been bedridden in a hospital. Its ending in particular is phenomenally optimistic. That was another Alexander Key theme: that good and decent people deserve to escape to a place worthy of them.

Selected works

As illustrator 
 In the Light of Myth: Selections from the World's Myths, compiled and interpreted by Rannie B. Baker (1925) 
 Real Legends of New England, G. Waldo Browne (1930) 
 The Book of Dragons, selected and edited by O. Muiriel Fuller (1931) 
 Suwannee River: Strange Green Land, Cecile Hulse Matschat (1938)

As writer 
 The Red Eagle: A Tale for Young Aviators (1930) 
Liberty or Death (1936)
With Daniel Boone on the Caroliny Trail (1941)
The Wrath and the Wind (1949)
Island Light (1950)
Sprockets: A Little Robot (1963)
Rivets and Sprockets (1964)
The Forgotten Door (1965) 
Bolts: a Robot Dog (1966)
Mystery of the Sassafras Chair (1968)
Escape to Witch Mountain (1968) 
The Golden Enemy (1969)
The Incredible Tide (1970)
Flight to the Lonesome Place (1971)
The Strange White Doves (1972)
The Preposterous Adventures of Swimmer (1973)
The Magic Meadow (1975)
Jagger, the Dog from Elsewhere (1976)
The Sword of Aradel (1977)
 Return from Witch Mountain (1978) – by Key based on the Disney motion picture; screenplay by Malcolm Marmorstein, based on characters created by Key  
The Case of the Vanishing Boy (1979)

References

External links
  Read some of Mr. Key's out-of-print books online.
 "Gone But Not Forgotten: Alexander Key"—The Bulletin of the Center for Children's Books, University of Illinois, November 2002
 The Forgotten Door, a three-episode television series based on Key's novel of the same name, distributed by ITV and broadcast in 1966
 Alexander Key: A Forgotten Author?
 
 
 

1904 births
1979 deaths
20th-century American novelists
American children's writers
American male novelists
American science fiction writers
United States Navy personnel of World War II
People from La Plata, Maryland
Writers from Jacksonville, Florida
Novelists from Maryland
20th-century American male writers
Novelists from Florida